Neobernaya is a genus of tropical sea snail, cowries, marine gastropod mollusks in the subfamily Zonariinae of the family Cypraeidae, the cowries. 

This was previously a subgenus of Cypraea.

Species
Species within the genus Neobernaya include:
Neobernaya spadicea (Swainson, 1823)

References

 Page on the genus
 Biolib page

Cypraeidae